"You're So Beautiful" is a song recorded by Donna Summer in 2003. It was written by Summer, Tony Moran, and Nathan DiGesare, and produced by Moran.

Despite the fact that the song wasn't given a commercial release as a single, but included as one of three new tracks on Universal's greatest hits package The Journey: The Very Best of Donna Summer (2003) and only released as a 12" promo single to club DJs, "You're So Beautiful" became a dance hit, reaching number 5 on the US Billboard Dance Club Songs chart and number 13 on Billboard's Hot Dance Airplay chart.

In 2005 the track was included on a second Universal compilation, Gold.

Track listing
A. You're So Beautiful (Tony & Mac's Dancefloor Journey Mix) - 10:32 	
B. You're So Beautiful (Friscia & Lamboy Beautiful Vocal Mix) - 9:28

Other versions
Ultimate Club Mix - 10:50 (released on limited edition version of The Journey: The Very Best of Donna Summer)
Tony Moran Edit - 4:05 (released on Gold)

Charts

References

Donna Summer songs
2003 songs
2003 singles
Songs written by Donna Summer
Dance-pop songs
Mercury Records singles
Songs written by Tony Moran
Electronic dance music songs
House music songs